John-Wessel Bell is a South African born rugby union player who currently plays for Spanish División de Honor side Valladolid RAC and for the Spain national rugby union team.

He was a member of the Pumas side that won the Vodacom Cup for the first time in 2015, beating  24–7 in the final. Bell made seven appearances during the season, scoring one try.

He signed a contract to join Johannesburg-based side the  prior to the 2016 season.

After the 2016 Currie Cup, Bell joined Spanish División de Honor side Valladolid RAC.

References

South African rugby union players
Living people
1990 births
Pumas (Currie Cup) players
Falcons (rugby union) players
Rugby union fullbacks
Rugby union players from Cape Town